The Portrait of Adèle Besson is an oil painting in the Post-Impressionist style made by Auguste Renoir in 1918, representing the wife of George Besson.

The couple gave a large bequest to the Museum of Fine Arts in Besançon (France). Their collection consisted of works of contemporary art (early 20th century). The installation of the collection at the Museum caused the expansion of the museum building, including the construction of the central staircase by Louis Miquel (student of Le Corbusier). This picture is part of their bequest.

References 

Adele Besson
1918 paintings
Adele Besson
Besson, Adele
Collections of the Musée des Beaux-Arts et d'archéologie de Besançon